According to the 5th century BCE Greek historian Herodotus, Orotalt was a god of pre-Islamic Arabia whom he identified with the Greek god Dionysus:

Also known as Đū Shará or Dusares (which means "Possessor of the (Mountain) Shara"), Orotalt was worshipped by the Nabataeans, Arabs who inhabited southern Jordan, Canaan and the northern part of Arabia.

Etymology 
Merriam-Webster's Encyclopedia of World Religions states that Orotalt is a phonetic transcription of the name of the sun god Ruḍā.

Brewer's Dictionary of Phrase and Fable derives it from a corruption of Allāh ta'āla ("God Exalted"). The transcription from Allāh ta'āla to Orotalt can be explained thus: The Semitic 'l' is commonly equated with 'r' in Greek, and vice versa. For example, the word "river" is Nahr in Arabic, Nehar in Hebrew and Nahal in other Semitic languages, which was likely transcribed as Νεῖλος in Greek (as in the Nile river).

References 

Arabian gods
Nabataea
Dionysus